Thomas McAulay may refer to:

Thomas McAulay, candidate in Toronto municipal election, 1960#City council
Thomas McAulay, victim of Stockline Plastics factory explosion

See also
Thomas Macaulay (disambiguation)